Sapelo Island Lighthouse is a lighthouse in Georgia, 
United States, near the southern tip of Sapelo Island. It is the nation's second-oldest brick lighthouse and the oldest survivor among lighthouses designed by Winslow Lewis.  The lighthouse, oil building, the cistern, the footing of the 1905 light, the ruins of the fortification, and the associated range light were added to the National Register of Historic Places in 1997.

Its brick walls are several feet thick at the bottom, tapering to about two feet thick at the top.

History 

Sapelo Island Lighthouse was built in 1820. It was designed and built by Winslow Lewis. It had fifteen Lewis lamps with  reflectors. The lens was removed during the Civil War. It was extensively repaired after an 1867 storm and relit in 1868. The tower was damaged by a strong hurricane in 1898.

A pyramidal  skeletal tower lighthouse with a third-order Fresnel lens was built in 1905. This tower was dismantled and relocated in 1934 to South Fox Island, Michigan.

The 1820 lighthouse was inactive from 1905 to 1998, when it was restored to its 1890 appearance and was relit (with a modern light and lens).  Is now maintained by the Georgia Department of Natural Resources and is unofficial.

Keepers

 Jeremiah Lester 1821 – 1825
 William Donnelly 1827 – 1841 
 Henry M. Caulder 1843 - ?
 William Thomas 1845 – 1847
  Robert B. Mason 1849 – 1851
 Robert Hale ? – 1853)
 Alexander Hazzard 1853 – 1862, 1868 – 1869
 W.W. Brown 1869 
 James C. Clark 1869 – 1870 
 Montgomery P. Styles 1870 – 1871
 J.T. Clancy 1871
 Hiram Hammett 1871 – 1872 
 John Bradwell 1872 – 1873
 James Cromley, Sr. 1873 – 1889
 William G. Cromley 1890 – 1900
 James Cromley, Jr. 1900 – 1921
 Robert H. Cromley 1928 – 1933

See also
 Sapelo Island Range Front Light

References

External links
 

1820 establishments in Georgia (U.S. state)
Buildings and structures in McIntosh County, Georgia
Lighthouses completed in 1820
Lighthouses completed in 1905
Lighthouses on the National Register of Historic Places in Georgia (U.S. state)
Historic districts on the National Register of Historic Places in Georgia (U.S. state)
National Register of Historic Places in McIntosh County, Georgia